Akanji is a surname. Notable people with the surname include:

Adebisi Akanji (born 1930s), Nigerian artist
Manuel Akanji (born 1995), Swiss footballer
Michael Akanji (born 1984), Nigerian sexual health and rights advocate
Muideen Akanji (born 1992), Nigerian boxer
Murphy Akanji (born 1977), Nigerian footballer